The Badger Flat Limestone is a limestone geologic formation in California.

It preserves fossils dating back to the Ordovician period.

See also

 List of fossiliferous stratigraphic units in California
 Paleontology in California

References

Ordovician geology of California
Limestone formations of the United States
Ordovician System of North America
Geologic formations of California